was a Japanese professional wrestling event promoted by the New Year's Eve Pro-Wrestling Committee, comprising multiple independent wrestling promotions. The event, held on December 31, 2012, at Korakuen Hall in Tokyo, Japan aired live on Fighting TV Samurai.

Eighteen bouts were contested at the event, including two dark matches. In the main event, Abdullah Kobayashi defeated Shiori Asahi in a Falls Count Anywhere match. Other prominent matches saw the team of Harashima and Danshoku Dino represent DDT Pro-Wrestling in a winning effort against the teams of Yoshihito Sasaki and Yuji Okabayashi (representing Big Japan Pro Wrestling), and Kengo Mashimo and Shiori Asahi (representing Kaientai Dojo).

Production

Background
The tradition of holding a joint event for smaller promotions on New Year's Eve at Korakuen Hall started with the 2006 Indy Summit. In 2009, the  brand was created for the Tenka Sanbun no Kei: Ōmisoka New Year's Eve Special event.

2012 marked DDT Pro-Wrestling's 15th anniversary, Kaientai Dojo's 10th anniversary and Korakuen Hall's 50th anniversary. With Big Japan Pro Wrestling's 18 years of existence, this added up to 93 years, so promotions that were roughly 7 years old were invited to celebrate "Pro-Wrestling's 100th anniversary". The event also celebrated Shiori Asahi's 10th anniversary as a professional wrestler, which was mentioned in the event subtitle referencing Yasuo Baba's 1991 film .

There were fifteen participating promotions and brands at the event:

All Japan Pro Wrestling (AJPW)
Big Japan Pro Wrestling (BJW)
Combat Zone Wrestling (CZW)
 (666)
DDT Pro-Wrestling
Gatoh Move Pro Wrestling
Kaientai Dojo (K-Dojo)

Pro Wrestling Freedoms

Pro-Wrestling Team Dera

 (UPW)
Westside Xtreme Wrestling (wXw)

Storylines
The show featured thirteen professional wrestling matches that resulted from scripted storylines, where wrestlers portray villains, heroes, or less distinguishable characters in the scripted events that build tension and culminate in a wrestling match or series of matches. Five non-wrestling contests were also held including judo matches, a quiz and a karaoke challenge.

Results

Gauntlet match

References

2012 in professional wrestling
Active Advance Pro Wrestling
Big Japan Pro Wrestling shows
Combat Zone Wrestling shows
DDT Pro-Wrestling shows
Professional wrestling in Tokyo
Holidays themed professional wrestling events